Deltonotus' is an Asian genus of ground-hoppers (Orthoptera: Caelifera) in the subfamily Cladonotinae and tribe Cladonotini.

Species
Deltonotus includes the species:
 Deltonotus gibbiceps (Bolívar, 1902)
 Deltonotus hainanensis Zheng & Liang, 1985
 Deltonotus subcucullatus (Walker, 1871) – type species (as D. tectiformis Hancock)
 Deltonotus vietnamensis Storozhenko, 2011

References

External links
 Image and description at Rufford.org
 

Tetrigidae
Caelifera genera
Orthoptera of Indo-China